The Wallilabou River is a river in the northwest of Saint Vincent. It rises in the Grand Bonhomme Mountains in the centre of the island and flows Northwest to reach the Caribbean Sea North of Barrouallie. Wallilabou Falls-a tourist attraction-is located on this river, a short walk Northeast along the Leeward Highway. Several of the scenes from the film Pirates of the Caribbean: The Curse of the Black Pearl were filmed close to the mouth of the river.

References
Miller, D. (ed.) (2005) Caribbean Islands. (4th edition). Footscray, VIC: Lonely Planet.

St Vincent and the Grenadines Department of Surveys topographical map SERIES:E803(DOS317)SHEET:St Vincent North, EDITION: 6-DOS 1983 UTM, Scale:1:25000

Rivers of Saint Vincent and the Grenadines